James W. Rodgers (August 3, 1910 – March 30, 1960) was an American who was sentenced to death by the state of Utah for the murder of miner Charles Merrifield in 1957. In his final statement before his execution by firing squad in 1960, Rodgers requested a bulletproof vest. His execution by firing squad would be the last to be carried out in the United States before capital punishment was halted by the U.S. Supreme Court. The death penalty was reinstated in 1976 and the first person executed in Utah subsequent to that date was Gary Gilmore in 1977.

Background
Rodgers was born on August 3, 1910 in Lubbock, Texas, and was the eldest of five brothers and six sisters. His education was interrupted during the eighth grade. At the age of twelve, he left his family's household, where his father forced the children to work. By the age of sixteen, he became involved in a bootlegging operation and was injured in the legs by machine gun fire. Rodgers eventually became involved in armed robbery, spending over twenty years in incarceration at various prisons.

Death of Charles Merrifield

In 1957, Rodgers came from New Mexico to work as a part-time security guard with the Continental Uranium Company at its Rattlesnake uranium mine near La Sal, Utah. Following an altercation on June 19 of that year, James W. Rodgers shot miner Charles Merrifield, who died of multiple gunshot wounds to the head, arm, and torso. The two had been arguing over how to properly grease a scoop shovel.

Rodgers drove off in his truck, but was quickly apprehended in Colorado and turned over to the Grand County Jail in San Juan County, Utah. He claimed that he had been repeatedly threatened and thought Merrifield was going to "beat him up." Rodgers said that he "challenged Merrifield with a gun" and shot him when Merrifield attacked him with a large wrench.

Murder trial

Rodgers was arraigned at the San Juan County Courthouse in Monticello, Utah on June 26, 1957, and was formally charged with murder. Rodgers claimed that he was suffering from syphilis and pleaded "guilty by reason of insanity". During the trial, Rodgers asserted that he had killed Merrifield in self-defense. However, Merrifield was determined to have been shot by Rodgers' .38-caliber handgun while at the controls of the large shovel at the mine. Upon being convicted and sentenced to death, Rodgers was given the choice of execution by firing squad or hanging; he chose to be shot. Rodgers said that he was not worried because he would succumb to syphilis before his execution. However, he did not test positive for the disease under medical examination. Rodgers filed three appeals, including one to the Supreme Court of Utah, all of which were denied.

Rodgers was sent to death row at Utah State Prison, where he was considered a model prisoner and wrote of his "deepest gratitude for the many favors and the kindness" during his 2 years as an inmate. He made no request for a special last meal nor other favors before his execution.

Execution

On the morning of March 30, 1960, Rodgers was driven to the execution site on a clay flat about a mile (1.6 km) from the prison accompanied by San Juan County Sheriff Seth Wright and a prison chaplain. When asked for a final statement, Rodgers continued to insist that he was innocent and said, "I done told you my last request ... a bulletproof vest." He was dressed in denim and offered a coat, to which he replied, "Don't worry, I'll be where it's warm soon." Rodgers was strapped to a wooden chair inside a 20-foot (6.1 m) canvas enclosure. One of the marksmen was provided with a .30-30 rifle that was loaded with a blank, so that none of them would be certain who fired the lethal shots. Rodgers was executed at 6:16 a.m., the time of sunrise.

Rodgers' body was claimed for burial in California by his mother, who had last visited him ten days before the execution. Rodgers would be the last person to die by firing squad in the United States for almost 17 years, until Gary Gilmore became the first to be executed after the reinstatement of capital punishment by the U.S. Supreme Court decision of Gregg v. Georgia.

See also

Capital punishment in Utah
Capital punishment in the United States
List of people executed in Utah

References

Further reading

External links
The State of Utah v. James W. Rodgers – Supreme Court of Utah (September 23, 1958)
James W. Rodgers v. John W. Turner, warden – U.S. District Court of Utah (October 30, 1959)

1910 births
1960 deaths
American people convicted of murder
American robbers
American builders
Deaths by firearm in Utah
People convicted of murder by Utah
People executed by Utah by firing squad
20th-century executions by Utah
People executed for murder
People from Lubbock, Texas
20th-century executions of American people
Executed people from Texas
1957 murders in the United States
American people convicted of robbery